Maurice D. Rosenberg (January 4, 1909 – November 8, 1950) was an attorney and Democratic member of the Virginia House of Delegates representing Alexandria, Virginia.

Early life
Rosenberg was born January 4, 1909, in Harrisonburg, Virginia, and attended the Alexandria public schools.  He graduated from George Washington University in Washington, D.C., and received his law degree from the same university.

He served on the executive committee of B'nai B'rith for many years, beginning in the 1920s.  Rosenberg was also a member of many local Alexandria organizations, including the Independent Order of Odd Fellows, the Benevolent and Protective Order of Elks, the Knights of Pythias, the Eagles, the Virginia Bar Association, the Alexandria Bar Association and the Old Dominion Boat Club.

Political career
In 1935, Rosenberg was elected to the Virginia House of Delegates representing the City of Alexandria.  He was reelected three more times and served until 1943.

Death and memorials
Rosenberg died on November 8, 1950.  The local chapter of B'nai B'rith is named for Maurice D. Rosenberg.

References

1909 births
1950 deaths
Virginia lawyers
Democratic Party members of the Virginia House of Delegates
20th-century American Jews
Politicians from Alexandria, Virginia
George Washington University Law School alumni
20th-century American politicians
Lawyers from Alexandria, Virginia